William F. Curlett (County Down, Ireland, March 3, 1846 – January 21, 1914, San Francisco)  and Alexander Edward Curlett (called Aleck) (San Francisco,  February 6, 1881 – September 5, 1942)  were a father-and-son pair of architects. Aleck Curlett partnered with Claud Beelman as Curlett & Beelman (1919-1932).

The San Francisco firm of Curlett, Eisen, & Cuthbertson, Architects, was active in the 1880s; it designed the Los Angeles County Courthouse in 1887. In 1888, the firm occupied Room #41 of the Downey Block. (See Los Angeles, California, City Directory, 1888, p. 768.)

Works
A number of works by either or both Curletts, and by Curlett & Beelman, are listed on the U.S. National Register of Historic Places.
Works include (with attribution):
Board of Trade Building, 111 W. 7th St. Los Angeles, California (Curlett, Aleck), NRHP-listed 
Building at 816 South Grand Avenue, 816 S. Grand Ave. Los Angeles, California (Curlett, Aleck), NRHP-listed
Cooper Arms, 455 E. Ocean Blvd. Long Beach, California (Curlett & Beelman), NRHP-listed
Culver Hotel, 9400 Culver Blvd. Culver City, California (Curlett and Beelman), NRHP-listed
Equitable Building of Hollywood, 6253 W. Hollywood Blvd. (Curlett)
Haas Californiandy Factory, 54 Mint St. San Francisco, California (Curlett, William), NRHP-listed
Heinsbergen Decorating Company Building, 7415 Beverly Blvd. Los Angeles, California (Curlett & Beelman), NRHP-listed
Hotel Congress, 303-311 E. Congress St. Tucson, Arizona (Curlett, Aleck; William Curlett & Son), NRHP-listed
Mutual Savings Bank Building, 700 Market St., San Francisco, California, NRHP-listed
Packard Library, 301 4th St. Marysville, California (Curlett,William), NRHP-listed
Phelan Building, 760 Market St. San Francisco, California 
Theodore F. Payne House, 1409 Sutter St. San Francisco, California (Curlett,William F.), NRHP-listed
Proper Hotel, orig. Commercial Club of Southern Californialifornia, later Californiase Hotel, 1100 S. Broadway, Downtown Los Angeles (1926, as of 2020 under renovation to open as hotel)
Rialto Building, 300-320 E. Congress St. Tucson, Arizona (Curlett, Aleck; William curlett & Son), NRHP-listed
Rialto Theatre, 318 E. Congress St. Tucson, Arizona (Curlett, Aleck; William Curlett & Son), NRHP-listed
Roosevelt Building, 727 W. Seventh St. Los Angeles, California (Curlett, Aleck), NRHP-listed
St. Mark's Episcopal Church (Berkeley, California) 
Security Building, 234 N. Central Phoenix, Arizona (Curlett & Beelman), NRHP-listed
Villa Montalvo, 14800 Montalvo Rd. Saratoga, California (Curlett, William), NRHP-listed
Foreman & Clark Building, 701 South Hill St., Los Angeles (Curlett & Beelman)

Block, Curlett & Eisen

Works attributed to Block, Curlett & Eisen:
Potomac Block, west side of Broadway between 2nd and 3rd, Los Angeles, retail and offices, opened 1890

Curlett, Eisen & Cuthbertson
New Lanfranco Block, built 1888, 214–222 North Main St., Los Angeles

References

19th-century American architects
Irish emigrants to the United States
People from County Down
1846 births
1942 deaths
20th-century American architects